The Central General di Trahadonan di Corsow (CGTC) is a trade union federation on the island Curaçao in the Netherlands Antilles. It is affiliated with the International Trade Union Confederation.

References

Trade unions in Curaçao
International Trade Union Confederation